The Salmson 5 was a French aircraft built in 1917 during World War I intended for artillery spotting. It was based on the Salmson 2, but it was 23 km/h slower and offered no compensating advantages and only 1 aircraft was built.

Specifications

References

Citations

Bibliography

1910s French military reconnaissance aircraft
Biplanes
Salmson aircraft
Single-engined tractor aircraft
Aircraft first flown in 1917